is a Japanese choreographer and former singer and actress. She first gained recognition when she joined Hello! Project Kids and later became the lead vocalist of the girl group Cute until her retirement in 2006.

Career

2002–2005: Hello! Project Kids and ZYX

In 2002, Murakami auditioned for Hello! Project Kids with the song "Pittari Shitai X'mas!" by Petitmoni. Her audition tape was aired on Morning Musume's variety show Hello! Morning. She was placed in the group with 14 other girls. She made her first appearance in the 2002 film Koinu Dan no Monogatari.

In 2003, Murakami became a member of the subgroup ZYX along with Mari Yaguchi from Morning Musume, Erika Umeda, Maimi Yajima, Saki Shimizu, and Momoko Tsugunaga. They released their debut single, "Iku ZYX! Fly High" on August 6, 2003, followed by "Shiroi Tokyo" on December 10, 2003.

During the summer of 2004, Murakami appeared in the music video for "Yokohama Shinkirou" by Maki Goto. Later that year, she participated in singing "All for One & One for All!", a collaboration single released by all Hello! Project artists under the name "H.P. All Stars." Murakami sang the coupling track, "Suki ni Naccha Ikenai Hito", with Reina Tanaka and Airi Suzuki.

2005–2006: Cute

In 2004, Berryz Kobo was created with the intention of rotating all of the members of Hello! Project Kids to make time for school, but the idea was later scrapped, and the remaining girls who were not chosen were rebranded under the name Cute on June 11, 2005. Murakami became one of the lead vocals on all of the group's indies singles.

Murakami was grouped with Miki Fujimoto from Morning Musume and Miyabi Natsuyaki from Berryz Kobo for the shuffle unit Sexy Otonajan. They released the song "Onna, Kanashii, Otona" on June 22, 2005.

On November 1, 2006, shortly before Cute made their major label debut, Murakami left the group to concentrate on her studies. Following Cute's disbandment in 2017, she attended their final concert.

Choreography work 

Murakami arranged the choreography for Musumen's 8th single, "Shinsen! Ryūgūjō RENBO."

Discography

Filmography

Film

Television

Music video

Theater

References

1992 births
Living people
Japanese idols
Cute (Japanese idol group) members
Hello! Project Kids members
Japanese women pop singers
Japanese child singers
ZYX (pop group) members
Musicians from Saitama Prefecture
21st-century Japanese singers
21st-century Japanese women singers